Princess of Peace may refer to:

Princess Taiping, a princess of the Tang Dynasty in China 
Pocahontas, a 17th-century Native American, as described in Pocahontas, a 1994 film

See also
Prince of Peace (disambiguation)